Getaria   is a coastal town located in the province of Gipuzkoa, in the autonomous community of Basque Country, in the North of Spain. This coastal village is located on the Urola Coast, with Zarautz to the east and Zumaia to the west.

Getaria is known for being Juan Sebastián Elcano’s hometown, a seaman well-known for being the first man to circumnavigate the earth. He was captain of the Nao Victoria, the one ship in Magellan's ill-fated fleet which completed the voyage.

Today, Getaria is also famous for its restaurants serving grilled fish and a white wine with a protected designation of origin which is cultivated in the surroundings of this coastal town and takes the name of Getariako Txakolina. Moreover, the Cristobal Balenciaga Museum is also located in this village.

Thus, its most famous sons are Juan Sebastián Elcano, captain of the Nao Victoria, Admiral Miguel de Oquendo, who commanded the Guipúzcoa Squadron of the Spanish Armada, the explorer Domingo de Bonechea, and the couturier Cristóbal Balenciaga Eizaguirre.

In May 2012, a two-man team from Getaria won Google's "Model Your Town" competition by creating a complete 3D representation of their hometown.

Etymology

Traditionally, the town's name has been written as Guetaria. However, since 1980, the official toponym has become Getaria, which is the adaptation of the modern Basque orthography. Thus, in Spanish it is written Guetaria, and, though pronounced the same, in Basque it is written Getaria.

Apart from the Getaria of Gipuzkoa, there is another town 61 kilometers up the coast in Lapurdi (Labourd), the French Basque Country, which is called Guéthary in French, but the Basque pronunciation and spelling of the two towns is the same. Both villages are located on the Basque coast, and throughout history, many have sought the origin of the towns' names. Based on archaeological findings, the most convincing hypothesis is that the name of Getaria comes from the Latin word "cetaria". In the classic Latin, pronounced as [ketaria], it means "a place where fish is canned". Indeed, in both places, evidence of Roman facilities for canning fish have been found.

Another possible origin of the name is "guaita" in the Gascon language which means "lookout". During the Middle Ages various villages on the Basque coast were colonized by Gascons, and among these villages both Getarias could be found. Therefore, it was believed that Getari could be the result of a mix between "guaita" and "–ari", a suffix that is used in the Basque language for professions and would mean vigilante. For others, though, the name of Getaria results from the mix of "guaita" and "–erri", meaning town, creating a word that means the town of the vigilant.

Geography

The municipality of Getaria occupies a section of the central coast of Gipuzkoa in the Cantabrian Sea. This section of the coast consists of a steep ledge on which a series of coves and points have formed through erosion.

The historic centre of Getaria is located just between the mainland and the mountain San Antón, also called the mouse of Getaria due to its mouse-like shape. This mountain that characterizes the town, was an island until the 16th century.

In the interior part of the township, the mountain Garate (278 m) is located. This mountain runs parallel to the coast, and in its smooth skirts lie several farms belonging to the township of Getaria. These farms are typical of the Basque Country and they are called baserri.

Nearly all the land situated between the mountain Garate and the coast is covered in vineyards due to the microclimate that this area generates.

History

Probably the beginnings of a village in what today is Getaria could have been found in Roman times, as reflected in the finding of an "ace" of the previous pre-imperial era 2 b. C.

The Middle Ages

The village of Getaria was founded between 1180 and 1194 by King Sancho VI of Navarre, making Getaria, along with San Sebastián, one of the oldest towns in the province. During the second half of the 12th century, increasing and dominating the Cantabrian ports was a priority for the kings of Navarre.  After Gipuzkoa was conquered around the year 1200, King Alfonso VIII of Castile confirmed his Fuero «eo modo quo rex Navarre illud dedit vobis habendum» on 1 September 1209 in San Sebastián.  In 1571, the historian Esteban de Garibay confirmed the village's Navvarran founding in his book "Compendio Historial", stating that in 1209, Alfonso VIII gave Getaria the Fuero of San Sebastián thereby confirming its jurisdiction within Navarre.  Finally, the "Diccionario Geográfico-Histórico de España (1845-1850)" states that the town's municipal archives hold a letter dated January 20, 1201 sent by King Alfonso VIII from Burgos. In the letter it was declared that the inhabitants of Getaria had the right to pasture, water, meadows and forests. Therefore, it is clear that Getaria was founded by the kings of Navarre.
 
Furthermore, throughout history Getaria has had various privileges attesting to its status as a township.  The following are some of them:

1270. Sancion to cut in Gipuzkoa all the wood and firewood they needed to build their houses and ships.
1290. Exemption from tolls and other taxes in the Kingdom of Castile and León, Spain.
1407. The ships that brought wheat and other grains to the Beach of La Concha and the town dock should unload half their loads.

Regarding the town's maritime activities, they were the main source of income for the town in the Middle Ages. In the fifteenth century, the gap that existed between the island of San Antón and the historic centre was closed. The harbour is located south of the island, traditionally used as a whaling port. Indeed, in 1878, the last capture of a whale by fishermen of Zarautz and Getaria took place in nearby waters, the latter managing to take it to port. Nowadays, it is a major port of the Basque coast.

Thirty Years' War

Regarding the Thirty Years' War, during the summer of 1638 the Cardinal Richelieu had planned a campaign that would annex the strategic territory of Gipuzkoa. For achieving this, he wanted to occupy Hondarribia along with 20.000 soldiers. Besides, he needed a port to harbour a fleet of 50 vessels so as to devastate any relief plan to Hondarribia. Thus, the chosen port for this strategic plan was the one from Getaria. The July 24, 1638 the Spanish fleet commanded by Admiral Lope de Hoces was attacked, this attack was launched precisely from Guetaria. Only survived a Spanish galleon to this attack. However, when the troops of Geoffrey II (archbishop of Bordeaux) tried to take the town, they were destroyed by the defenders of Getaria and Zarautz and reinforcements from neighboring towns. Finally, the village was destroyed by the artillery of the French galleons, but not a single French soldier came close to its walls. Soon after, on September 7, the siege of Hondarribia would fail.

Peninsular War

During the Peninsular War, in 1811 Getaria is occupied by the French troops who leave Getaria in 1813 after having caused important damages.

Carlist Wars

In the Carlist Wars, in 1835 the village is again practically ruined. After being besieged by the Carlists, they finally captured it in 1836 and set on fire from several points, standing alone badly 16 damaged houses. The parish particularly, suffered the effects of the attack, and needed major repairs.

Economy

Getaria's principal sources of income are fishing, tourism and the viticulture of the Txakoli.

In the beginning of the nineteenth century, the population of this village worked more on agriculture than on fishing, thus, obtaining the best Txakoli of Gipuzkoa. Nowadays, there is still producing Txakoli but in a smaller amount. Therefore, today, fishing has become the main income source. However, now the fishing sector is in decline.

Besides, in the neighbourhoods of Askizu, Akerregi and Meagas cider is produced.

Administration

Bibliography

 Getaria. Una Historia desconocida (1397-1797)
 Celdrán Gomáriz, Pancracio (2004). Diccionario de topónimos españoles y sus gentilicios (5ª edición). Madrid: Espasa Calpe. p. 382. .
 Nieto Ballester, Emilio (1997). Breve diccionario de topónimos españoles. Madrid:Alianza Editorial. p. 183. .
 Idoia Arrieta Elizalde: «Getaria: nafar fundazioa duen hiribildua», BERRIA, 2009-09-08.
 Arrieta, Idoia: "Donostiaren konkistaren agiri ezkutuaren aurkezpena: ikerketaren ibilbidea eta ekarpen historiko-kritikoa" (pp. 227–248). En: 1512. Los territorios vascos y el Estado navarro. Actas del II Congreso de Historiadores de Navarra. San Sebastián: Txertoa, 2011. p. 234.
 Martínez Díez, G,; González Díez, E.; Martínez Llorente, F.J.: Colección de documentos medievales de las villas guipuzcoanas (1200-1369). San Sebastián: Diputación Foral de Guipúzcoa, 1991. p. 21.Dicho libro se encuentra en formato pdf. en la siguiente dirección. Citado por: Arrieta Elizalde, Idoia: «Getaria: nafar fundazioa duen hiribildua», BERRIA, 2009-09-08.
 Idoia Arrieta Elizalde: «Getaria: nafar fundazioa duen hiribildua», BERRIA, 2009-09-08.
 Garibay y Zamalloa, Esteban de: Compendio historial de las Chronicas y universal historia de todos los reynos de España...(1571), libro XII, capítulo 32, p. 734. Citado por: Arrieta, Idoia: "Donostiaren konkistaren agiri ezkutuaren aurkezpena"...Op. Cit., 233.
 Getaria. La concesión del titulo de "villa"
 Idoia Arrieta Elizalde: «Getaria: nafar fundazioa duen hiribildua», BERRIA, 2009-09-08.
 Martínez de Isasi, Lope: Compendio Historial de Guipúzcoa (1625). Bilbao: La Gran Enciclopedia Vasca, 1972. p. 586. Citado por: Arrieta, Idoia: "Donostiaren konkistaren agiri ezkutuaren aurkezpena"...Op. Cit., 233.
 Idoia Arrieta Elizalde: «Getaria: nafar fundazioa duen hiribildua», BERRIA, 2009-09-08.
 Caro Baroja, Julio: Los vascos y la historia a través de Garibay. San Sebastián: Diputación Foral de Guipúzcoa, 2002. pp. 40–45. [Reedición debido al 30 aniversario de su primera publicación]. Citado por: Arrieta, Idoia: "Donostiaren konkistaren agiri ezkutuaren aurkezpena"...Op. Cit. p. 233.
 Arrieta, Idoia: "Donostiaren konkistaren agiri ezkutuaren aurkezpena"...Op. cit., p. 235.
 Getaria. Una Historia desconocida (1397-1797)
 Guetaria. (2015, 18 de enero). Wikipedia, La enciclopedia libre. Fecha de consulta: 17:07, mayo 28, 2015 desde http://es.wikipedia.org/w/index.php?title=Guetaria&oldid=79456564.

See also
San Anton

Notes

External links

 Official Website Information available in Spanish, English, French and Basque.
 GETARIA in the Bernardo Estornés Lasa - Auñamendi Encyclopedia (Euskomedia Fundazioa) Information available in Spanish

Municipalities in Gipuzkoa
Fishing communities
Populated coastal places in Spain